The WD-11 vacuum tube, a triode, was introduced by the Westinghouse Electric corporation in 1922 for their Aeriola RF model radio and found use in other contemporary regenerative receivers (used as a detector-amplifier) including the Regenoflex and Radiola series.

The WD11 and "RCA-11" (and later simply named "11" by RCA and Philips/Miniwatt) have the following characteristics:

Drawbacks

The WD-11's design was somewhat ill thought out, when the filament burns out it has a tendency to contact the plate, feeding high voltages back through the heater circuitry and subsequently burning out the filaments on the remaining tubes,.
The WD-11 also has a unique 4 pin base layout that was unlike any subsequent UV and UX style tube base. It had 3 "small" pins and one "large" pin. (Later UV based tubes relied on an index pin on the side of the tube base and UX tubes had 2 large and 2 small pins to ensure proper indexing.)
 
It was replaced just a year later by higher performance tubes which were less likely to encounter the filament shorting problem, Westinghouse Electric's WD-12 and General Electric's UX-199. No radios using the WD-11 tube were designed after 1924, RCA ceased production and issued a service bulletin describing how to retrofit existing sets to use the newer UX-199 triodes.

Collectiblity
Because of its rarity it has become one of the most valuable vacuum tubes in the world. New-old-stock units have sold for as much as US$180 and used tubes for over $100, more than the original price of the radios that use them. Collectors rarely, if ever use these tubes for fear of burning them out.

Substitution
Sets that use the costly WD-11 and UV-199 tubes can be modified to use the 1A5/GT octal power pentode (Which cost around $2.50) by wiring a 5.1 ohm resistor between the pins of the filament and fabricating an octal-to-four pin adaptor. The pin for the 1A5's suppressor is left unconnected and the screen connected to the plate.

The type 12 (also known as RCA-12) is electrically identical to the type 11, but with a more common UX4 base.

External links
Data sheet for WD-11

Here is a link on how to modify other tubes to use in place of a wd11:
 https://www.6v6.co.uk/vcomp/tech_tips/wd11.htm

Vacuum tubes